Ilse Paula Steppat (30 November 1917 – 21 December 1969) was a German actress. Her husband was noted actor and director Max Nosseck.

Biography

She began her cinematic career at the age of 15 playing Joan of Arc. Steppat appeared regularly on the German stage, and starred in more than forty movies. In the 1960s, she appeared frequently in crime movies based on the work of author Edgar Wallace, such as Die Gruft mit dem Rätselschloss, Der unheimliche Mönch and Die blaue Hand, which brought her great fame in Germany.

In her only English language role, Steppat played Blofeld's assistant and henchwoman Irma Bunt in the James Bond movie On Her Majesty's Secret Service. 

In the first English language conversation between Steppat and the movie's producer, Albert R. Broccoli, she confused the word verlobt (engaged) with engagiert (involved). 

Despite this, however, she was awarded the role of Irma Bunt. Steppat was unable to capitalise on her new fame outside Germany, as she died of a heart attack only four days after the movie's international release. She was buried in the Waldfriedhof Dahlem in Berlin.  Steppat was supposed to reprise her role as Irma Bunt in Diamonds Are Forever. However her character was withdrawn after the actress's death.

Selected filmography

1947: Marriage in the Shadows – Elisabeth Maurer
1949: Die Brücke – Therese Sander
1949: The Blue Swords – Frau von Tschirnhausen
1950: The Man Who Wanted to Live Twice – Oberschwester Hilde
1950: The Rabanser Case – Baronin Felten
1951: Die Tat des Anderen 
1951: Veronika the Maid – Alice
1951: The Guilt of Doctor Homma – Dr. Ilse Kersten
1951: Hanna Amon – Vera Colombani
1952: When the Heath Dreams at Night – Brigitte
1952: Shooting Stars – Karena Rodde
1953: The Chaplain of San Lorenzo – Isabella Catani
1954: Captain Wronski – Leonore Cronberg
1954: The Phantom of the Big Tent – Dolores, Frau mit dem Löwen
1955: Doctor Solm – Claudia Möllenhauer, Tochter
1955: The Dark Star – Frl. Rieger, die Lehrerin
1955: Die Ratten – Frau Knobbe
1955: The Captain and His Hero – Yvonne
1956: Winter in the Woods – Frieda Stengel
1956: Weil du arm bist, muβt du früher sterben – Ada Schenk
1957:  – Coletta Nicolini
1957: Confessions of Felix Krull – Maria Pia Kuckuck
1958: Night Nurse Ingeborg  – Frau Burger
1958:  – Frau Clavius
1958: Ósmy dzień tygodnia – Walicka
1958: Sehnsucht hat mich verführt – Brandner-Bäuerin
1958: Romarei, das Mädchen mit den grünen Augen – Witwe Prang
1960: Pension Schöller – Amalie Schöller
1960: Im Namen einer Mutter – Frau Barlowsky
1960: You Don't Shoot at Angels – Bellini
1962: The Post Has Gone – Elfriede Stolze
1963: Apartmentzauber – Sittenkommissarian
1963: Der Unsichtbare – Dr. Louise Richards
1964: The Curse of the Hidden Vault – Margaret
1965: Der unheimliche Mönch (The Sinister Monk) – Lady Patricia
1966: Living It Up – Carol Stevens
1967: Creature with the Blue Hand – Lady Emerson
1968: Death in the Red Jaguar – Mrs. Cunnings
1969: On Her Majesty's Secret Service – Irma Bunt (final film role)

External links

German film actresses
1917 births
1969 deaths
Actors from Wuppertal
German stage actresses
20th-century German actresses
German voice actresses